Nomnikelo Veto (born 3 January 1997) is a field hockey player from South Africa. In 2020, she was an athlete at the Summer Olympics.

Personal life
Nomnikelo Veto was born in Gqeberha, and grew up in the neighbouring suburb of Walmer.

Career

International experience 
In the summer of 2021, after the Summer Olympics in Tokyo, Veto went to Italy to play for Cus Torino in Italian Serie A1. She scored the first goal of the season against Butterfly Rome. She scored five other goals in the first part of the season: 3 in Serie A1 and 2 in Coppa Italia.

Under–21
In 2016, Veto made her debut for the South Africa U–21 team at the Junior Africa Cup in Windhoek.

National team
Veto made her senior international debut for South Africa in 2019, during a test series against Namibia in Randburg. She followed this up with a series of appearances throughout the year, most notably at the FIH Series Finals in Valencia.

Following her series of international appearances in 2019, Veto was named to the South Africa squad for the 2020 Summer Olympics in Tokyo. She made her Olympic debut on 24 July 2021, in the Pool A match against Ireland.

References

External links

1997 births
Living people
Female field hockey forwards
South African female field hockey players
Sportspeople from Port Elizabeth
Field hockey players at the 2020 Summer Olympics
Olympic field hockey players of South Africa